John Pearson,   (3 January 1758, in York – 12 May 1826, in London) was an eminent British surgeon in the late eighteenth and early nineteenth centuries.

After an apprenticeship in Morpeth he studied under William Hey. In 1780 he came to St. George's Hospital, London to work under John Hunter. He became house surgeon at Lock Hospital staying until 1818. He was also surgeon to the Public Dispensary, Carey Street. His son John Norman Pearson was an eminent Anglican priest.

Notes

1758 births
1826 deaths
People from York
English surgeons
Fellows of the Royal Society
Medical doctors from Yorkshire

18th-century surgeons